This is a list of years in Japanese television.

Twenty-first century

Twentieth century

See also 
 List of years in Japan
 Lists of Japanese films
 List of years in television

Television
Television in Japan by year
Japanese television